Davletkulovo (Däwlätqol) is a rural locality (a village) in Korneyevsky Selsoviet, Meleuzovsky District, Bashkortostan, Russia. The population was 145 as of 2010. There are 2 streets.

Geography 
Davletkulovo is located 51 km north of Meleuz (the district's administrative centre) by road. Sukharevka is the nearest rural locality.

References 

Rural localities in Meleuzovsky District